Columbus, the capital city of Ohio, was founded on the east bank of the Scioto River in 1812. The city was founded as its capitol, beside the town of Franklinton, since incorporated into Columbus. The city's early history was gradual, as residents dealt with flooding and cholera epidemics, and the city had few direct connections to other cities. This led creation of a feeder canal, and later, freight and passenger railroads. The city became known for its industry and commercial businesses into the 20th century, though it experienced a lull in development in the late 20th century. In the 21st century, Columbus has been increasingly revitalized, led by parks projects, new developments, and efforts to beautify individual neighborhoods.

Ancient and early history

Between 1000 B.C. and 1700 A.D., the Columbus metropolitan area was a center to indigenous cultures known as the Moundbuilders. The cultures included the Adena, Hopewell and Fort Ancient people. The only remaining physical evidence of the cultures are their burial mounds and what they contained. Most of Central Ohio's remaining mounds are located outside of Columbus city boundaries, though the Shrum Mound is upkept, now part of a public park and historic site. The city's Mound Street derives its name from a mound that existed by the intersection of Mound and High Streets. The mound's clay was used in bricks for most of the cit'y initial brick buildings; many were subsequently used in the Ohio Statehouse. The city's Ohio History Center maintains a collection of artifacts from these cultures.

18th century: Ohio Country

The area including modern-day Columbus once comprised the Ohio Country, under the nominal control of the French colonial empire through the Viceroyalty of New France from 1663 until 1763. In the 18th century, European traders flocked to the area, attracted by the fur trade.

The area was often caught between warring factions, including American Indian and European interests. In the 1740s, Pennsylvania traders overran the territory until the French forcibly evicted them.

In the early 1750s, the Ohio Company sent George Washington to the Ohio Country to survey. Fighting for control of the territory in the French and Indian War (1754-1763) became part of the international Seven Years' War (1756-1763). During this period, the region routinely suffered turmoil, massacres, and battles. The 1763 Treaty of Paris ceded the Ohio Country to the British Empire.

Virginia Military District
After the American Revolution, the Virginia Military District became part of Ohio Country as a territory of Virginia. Colonists from the East Coast moved in, but rather than finding an empty frontier, they encountered people of the Miami, Delaware, Wyandot, Shawnee, and Mingo nations, as well as European traders. The tribes resisted expansion by the fledgling United States, leading to years of bitter conflict. The decisive Battle of Fallen Timbers resulted in the Treaty of Greenville, which finally opened the way for new settlements. By 1797, a young surveyor from Virginia named Lucas Sullivant had founded a permanent settlement on the west bank of the forks of the Scioto River and Olentangy River. An admirer of Benjamin Franklin, Sullivant chose to name his frontier village "Franklinton". The location was desirable for its proximity to navigable rivers—but Sullivant was initially foiled when, in 1798, a large flood wiped out the new settlement. He persevered, and the village was rebuilt.

After the Revolution land comprising parts of Franklin and adjacent counties was set aside by the United States Congress for settlement by Canadians and Nova Scotians who were sympathetic to the colonial cause and had their land and possessions seized by the British government. The Statehouse sits on land once contained in the Refugee Tract.

19th century: statehood, city establishment, and development

After Ohio achieved statehood in 1803, political infighting among prominent Ohio leaders led to the state capital moving from Chillicothe to Zanesville and back again. Desiring to settle on a location, the state legislature considered Franklinton, Dublin, Worthington, and Delaware before compromising on a plan to build a new city in the state's center, near major transportation routes, primarily rivers. As well, Franklinton landowners had donated two  plots in an effort to convince the state to move its capitol there. The two spaces were set to become Capitol Square (for the Ohio Statehouse) and the Ohio Penitentiary. Named in honor of Christopher Columbus, the city was founded on February 14, 1812, on the "High Banks opposite Franklinton at the Forks of the Scioto most known as Wolf's Ridge." At the time, this area was a dense forestland, used only as a hunting ground.

The city was incorporated as a borough on February 10, 1816. Nine people were elected to fill the municipality's various positions of mayor, treasurer, and several others. In 1816–1817, Jarvis W. Pike would serve as the first mayor. Although the recent War of 1812 had brought prosperity to the area, the subsequent recession and conflicting claims to the land threatened the new town's success. Early conditions were abysmal with frequent bouts of fevers, attributed to malaria from the flooding rivers, and an outbreak of cholera in 1833. It led Columbus to appoint the Board of Health, now part of the Columbus Public Health department. The outbreak, which remained in the city from July to September 1833, killed 100 people.

Columbus was without direct river or trail connections to other Ohio cities, leading to slow initial growth. The National Road reached Columbus from Baltimore in 1831, which complemented the city's new link to the Ohio and Erie Canal, both of which facilitated a population boom. A wave of European immigrants led to the creation of two ethnic enclaves on the city's outskirts. A large Irish population settled in the north along Naghten Street (presently Nationwide Boulevard), while the Germans took advantage of the cheap land to the south, creating a community that came to be known as the Das Alte Südende (The Old South End). Columbus's German population constructed numerous breweries, Trinity Lutheran Seminary, and Capital University.

With a population of 3,500, Columbus was officially chartered as a city on March 3, 1834. On that day the legislature carried out a special act, which granted legislative authority to the city council and judicial authority to the mayor. Elections were held in April of that year, with voters choosing one John Brooks as the first mayor. Columbus annexed the then-separate city of Franklinton in 1837.

In 1850, the Columbus and Xenia Railroad became the first railroad into the city, followed by the Cleveland, Columbus and Cincinnati Railroad in 1851. The two railroads built a joint Union Station on the east side of High Street just north of Naghten (then called North Public Lane). Rail traffic into Columbus increased—by 1875, eight railroads served Columbus, and the rail companies built a new, more elaborate station. Another cholera outbreak hit Columbus in 1849, prompting the opening of the city's Green Lawn Cemetery.

On January 7, 1857, the Ohio Statehouse finally opened after 18 years of construction. Site construction continued until 1861.

Before the abolition of slavery in the South in 1863, the Underground Railroad was active in Columbus; led, in part, by James Preston Poindexter. Poindexter arrived in Columbus in the 1830s and became a Baptist Preacher and leader in the city's African-American community until the turn of the century.

During the Civil War, Columbus was a major base for the volunteer Union Army. It housed 26,000 troops and held up to 9,000 Confederate prisoners of war at Camp Chase, at what is now the Hilltop neighborhood of west Columbus. Over 2,000 Confederate soldiers remain buried at the site, making it one of the North's largest Confederate cemeteries. North of Columbus, along the Delaware Road, the Regular Army established Camp Thomas, where the 18th U.S. Infantry organized and trained.

By virtue of the Morrill Land-Grant Colleges Act, the Ohio Agricultural and Mechanical College (which became Ohio State University) founded in 1870 on the former estate of William and Hannah Neil.

By the end of the 19th century, Columbus was home to several major manufacturing businesses. The city became known as the "Buggy Capital of the World," thanks to the two dozen buggy factories—notably the Columbus Buggy Company, founded in 1875 by C.D. Firestone. The Columbus Consolidated Brewing Company also rose to prominence during this time and might have achieved even greater success were it not for the Anti-Saloon League in neighboring Westerville.
In the steel industry, a forward-thinking man named Samuel P. Bush presided over the Buckeye Steel Castings Company. Columbus was also a popular location for labor organizations. In 1886, Samuel Gompers founded the American Federation of Labor in Druid's Hall on S. Fourth Street, and in 1890 the United Mine Workers of America was founded at old City Hall. In 1894, James Thurber, who would go on to an illustrious literary career in Paris and New York City, was born in the city. Today Ohio State's theater department has a performance center named in his honor, and his youthful home near the Discovery District is on the National Register of Historic Places.

20th century

The Columbus Experiment was an environmental project in 1908 which involved construction of the first water plant in the world to apply filtration and softening, designed and invented by two brothers, Clarence and Charles Hoover. Those working to construct the project included Jeremiah O'Shaughnessy, name-bearer of the Columbus metropolitan area's O'Shaughnessy Dam. This invention helped drastically reduce typhoid deaths. The essential design is still used today.

The 1910 Columbus streetcar strike took place in downtown Columbus; the strike action turned into a violent riot, though was eventually unsuccessful.

Columbus earned one of its nicknames, The Arch City, because of the dozens of wooden arches that spanned High Street at the turn of the 20th century. The arches illuminated the thoroughfare and eventually became the means by which electric power was provided to the new streetcars. The city tore down the arches and replaced them with cluster lights in 1914 but reconstructed them from metal in the Short North district in 2002 for their unique historical interest.

On March 25, 1913, the Great Flood of 1913 in Columbus devastated the neighborhood of Franklinton, leaving over ninety people dead and thousands of West Side residents homeless. To prevent flooding, the Army Corps of Engineers recommended widening the Scioto River through downtown, constructing new bridges, and building a retaining wall along its banks. With the strength of the post-World War I economy, a construction boom occurred in the 1920s, resulting in a new Civic center, the Ohio Theatre, the American Insurance Union Citadel, and, to the north, a massive new Ohio Stadium. Although the American Professional Football Association was founded in Canton in 1920, its head offices moved to Columbus in 1921 to the New Hayden Building and remained in the city until 1941. In 1922, the association's name was changed to the National Football League. A decade later, in 1931, at a convention in the city, the Jehovah's Witnesses took that name by which they are known today.

The effects of the Great Depression were less severe in Columbus, as the city's diversified economy helped it fare better than its Rust Belt neighbors. World War II brought many new jobs and another population surge. This time, most new arrivals were migrants from the "extraordinarily depressed rural areas" of Appalachia, who would soon account for more than a third of Columbus's growing population. In 1948, the Town and Country Shopping Center opened in suburban Whitehall, and it is now regarded as one of the first modern shopping centers in the United States.

The construction of the Interstate Highway System signaled the arrival of rapid suburb development in central Ohio. To protect the city's tax base from this suburbanization, Columbus adopted a policy of linking sewer and water hookups to annexation to the city. 

In December 1977, Warner Cable transformed cable TV service in thousands of Columbus households with QUBE, which utilized a remote control device that was intended to change television into an interactive experience with audiences. The service launched amidst considerable national and international press coverage.

By the early 1990s, Columbus had grown to become Ohio's largest city in land area and in population. Efforts to revitalize downtown Columbus have had some success in recent decades, though like most major American cities, some architectural heritage was lost in the process. In the 1970s, landmarks such as Union Station and the Neil House hotel were razed to construct high-rise offices and big retail space. The PNC Bank building was constructed in 1977, as well as the Nationwide Plaza buildings and other towers that sprouted during this period. The construction of the Greater Columbus Convention Center has brought major conventions and trade shows to the city.

AmeriFlora '92 was held in the city in 1992, part of the Christopher Columbus Quincentennial Jubilee, celebrating the 500th anniversary of Columbus's first voyage. Its organizers spent $95 million on it. The organizers also planned to create a replica Native American village, among other attractions. Local and national native leaders protested the event with a day of mourning, followed by protests and fasts at City Hall. The protests prevented the native village from being exhibited. Annual fasts continued until 1997. A protest also took place during the dedication of the Santa Maria replica, an event held in late 1991 on the day before Columbus Day and in time for the jubilee.

21st century

In 1999, just before the turn of the 21st century, the city's first African American mayor was elected. Michael Coleman, a Democrat, served 16 years, the longest of any mayor of the city. Coleman's administration led to Nationwide Insurance redeveloping the former Ohio Penitentiary site and nearby blocks into the Arena District. Similar new construction and redevelopment was taking place in the Brewery District, and a flood wall was completed in Franklinton in 2004, finally letting development resume in the neighborhood.

The Scioto Mile began development along the riverfront, an area that already had the Miranova Corporate Center and The Condominiums at North Bank Park.

The 2010 United States foreclosure crisis forced the city to purchase numerous foreclosed, vacant properties to renovate or demolish themat a cost of tens of millions of dollars. In February 2011, Columbus had 6,117 vacant properties, according to city officials.

Since 2010, Columbus has been growing and improving. From 2010 to 2017, the city added 164,000 jobs, second in the United States. The city is focused on downtown revitalization, with recent projects being the Columbus Commons park, parks along the Scioto Mile developed along with a reshaped riverfront, and developments in the Arena District and Franklinton.

Around 2018, Columbus became one of 20 cities as finalists in Amazon's search for a new headquarters, dubbed Amazon HQ2. The city planned tax incentives of about $500,000, and looked to the company moving into the Franklinton, Easton, or Ohio State University areas.

In 2020, 5G service began in the city, with Verizon and AT&T installing cell towers throughout the city. The pole installation was controversial in historic districts, where residents and the city only had say over wood versus metal poles, and not in their prominent placement in historic neighborhoods. In February and March 2020, the city began to have its first cases of Coronavirus disease 2019, the disease which created the COVID-19 pandemic. The city is in a state of emergency, with all nonessential businesses closed state-wide. There are 3,432 cases of the disease across the city, . In May, as COVID-19 persisted in the city, businesses began to reopen. Meanwhile, riots and protests over the murder of George Floyd took place in the city on May 28–30, leading to damaged storefronts across downtown Columbus, with graffiti, trash, and looting around much of downtown. Peaceful protests spanned into the following months. 2020 also marked a record number of homicides in the city, with 144 by November 13.

See also

 Timeline of Columbus, Ohio

References

Bibliography

External links

  
  A program that features the history of and literary life in Columbus.

 
Columbus